Petra Vlhová (born 13 June 1995) is a Slovak World Cup alpine ski racer who specialises in the technical events of slalom and giant slalom. Vlhová won the World Cup overall title in 2021 and the gold medal in the 2022 Winter Olympics in the slalom event, becoming the first Slovak skier to achieve these feats.

Career
Born in Liptovský Mikuláš during childhood, she attended training sessions at Podbreziny ski center in her native Litpovský Mikuláš. With an altitude of 700 meters and tracks with a combined length of 550 meters, the ski center entered disusage in the later 2000s and early 2010s. In 2022, Vlhová supported the restart of the center and the local youth training groups.

Vlhová won a gold medal in 2012 Winter Youth Olympics and represented Slovakia in the 2014 Winter Olympics. She also won gold in the slalom at the Junior World Championships in 2014 in Jasná, Slovakia.

World Cup

2019 season
In December 2018, Vlhová scored the first World Cup giant slalom win for Slovakia in a race in Semmering, Austria – she was in fourth place after the first run but set the second fastest time on the second run  for the victory: her previous best GS result had been seventh. A few days later she won a parallel slalom at the foot of the Holmenkollbakken in Oslo, the sixth win of her career, setting a new record for the most World Cup wins by a Slovak alpine skier, eclipsing Veronika Velez-Zuzulová.

In January 2019, having finished as runner-up to Mikaela Shiffrin in the first five classic slaloms of the World Cup season, Vlhová won the slalom in Flachau, setting the fastest time on the second run to take the win after placing third in the first run and taking the winner's €70,000 prize, the biggest women's prize purse of the World Cup season. The race was her fifth win in classic slalom, putting her one ahead of Velez-Zuzulová in terms of wins in the discipline.

At the Alpine World Ski Championships in February 2019, Vlhová took a complete set of medals. She claimed the first individual medal for a Slovak skier – a silver in the combined – after being edged out by Wendy Holdener by three-hundredths of a second. She then won the first gold medal for Slovakia in the giant slalom, before taking the bronze in the slalom.

2020 season
Vlhová started the 2020 season with a 14th-place finish in giant slalom at Sölden. She reached her first podium in the season on Killington when she finished second in Slalom. On 15 December 2019, she won a Parallel slalom race in  St. Moritz. In the last race of 2019, she finished second again in Lienz behind Mikaela Shiffrin. She started the new year with three victories in 4 races. First, she won the slalom in Zagreb on 4 January; 10 days later, she triumphed in the Flachau slalom, and then she took her only Giant Slalom win of the season on 18 January, when she shared the spoils with Federica Brignone in Sestriere.

Vlhová started competing in the speed events in her bid to win the big crystal globe in the later part of the season. She claimed two 6th places in Bansko, one in the downhill and one in the super-G. She claimed two other top 10 results in Garmisch-Partenkirchen. Her final win of the season came in slalom in Kranjska Gora on 16 February. She recorded a new personal best downhill with a 4th place in Crans Montana on 21 February. In the season's final race, she finished 4th in a super-G in La Thuile, which was her best result in the discipline up to that point.

The season was cut short by the COVID-19 pandemic. Vlhová finished 3rd in the overall world cup standings, winning her first small crystal globes, one for slalom and one for parallel events.

2021 season
Vlhová had a strong start to the season with 3rd place in the opening giant slalom in Sölden. She followed that up with three victories in a row, having won two slaloms in two days in Levi and a parallel giant slalom in Lech/Zürs. In December, Vlhová finished 3rd in the first of two giant slaloms in Courchevel (France) but did not finish the other one two days later. In Val d'Isère, she finished 26th and 33rd in the two downhills before getting 6th place in the super-G a day later. Vlhová recorded three more victories in the season - slalom in Zagreb, giant slalom on her home track in Jasná, and slalom in Åre. She also recorded her first podium in a speed event when she finished 2nd in the super-G in Garmisch-Partenkirchen on February 1.

She also won two silver medals at the World Championships in Cortina d'Ampezzo, one in the alpine combined and one in slalom.

Vlhová secured her first overall title at the world cup finals in Lenzerheide, finishing 6th in slalom. She became the first Slovak skier to achieve this title.

2022 season
Vlhová parted ways with her Italian coach Livio Magoni shortly after the end of the 2021 season after a 5-year partnership. She hired swiss coach Mauro Pini as replacement.

Vlhová had a strong start to the season with 3rd place in the opening giant slalom in Sölden. She followed that up with two victories in a row, having won two slaloms in two days in Levi. She won three more slaloms in Lienz, Zagreb and Kranjska Gora and clinched the slalom crystal globe with a second place finish in Schladming, with two slaloms remaining.

She became the first Slovak alpine skier to win an Olympic medal by winning gold in slalom in Beijing. She was in 8th place after the first round, 0.72 seconds behind Lena Dürr, but then produced the fastest run on the second leg to win gold by 0.08 seconds ahead of reigning world champion Katharina Liensberger.

After the Olympics, Vlhová mounted a challenge to defend her overall world cup title. She won the giant slalom in Åre to record her sixth win of the season. She finally lost the chance to win the big crystal globe after the final super-G race in Courchevel/Méribel, where Mikaela Shiffrin finished in 2nd position and clinched the title. Vlhová finished off the season with two podiums in slalom and giant slalom.

World Cup results

Season titles
4 titles – (1 overall, 2 Slalom, 1 Parallel)

Season standings

Race victories

Podiums

Including both parallel slalom and parallel giant slalom.  Two parallel events have been classified in the ski-db.com results as classic events (the City Event slalom on 30/01/18 and the City Event slalom on 01/01/19).  They are shown here as parallel events.

World Championship results

Olympic results

See also
List of FIS Alpine Ski World Cup women's race winners
List of Youth Olympic Games gold medalists who won Olympic gold medals

References

External links
 
  

1995 births
Living people
Olympic alpine skiers of Slovakia
Slovak female alpine skiers
Alpine skiers at the 2014 Winter Olympics
Alpine skiers at the 2018 Winter Olympics
Alpine skiers at the 2022 Winter Olympics
Medalists at the 2022 Winter Olympics
Olympic medalists in alpine skiing
Olympic gold medalists for Slovakia
Sportspeople from Liptovský Mikuláš
Alpine skiers at the 2012 Winter Youth Olympics
Youth Olympic gold medalists for Slovakia